"Something Changed" is a song by Britpop band Pulp, released on their 1995 album, Different Class. Written much earlier in the band's existence but revived for the Different Class sessions, "Something Changed" features lyrics that focused on the random nature as to how important events happen in life. The song also features a guitar solo performed by guitarist Mark Webber.

"Something Changed" was released as the fourth and final single from Different Class, reaching number 10 on the UK Singles Chart and number 30 in both Iceland and Ireland. It has since received critical acclaim.

Background
According to guitarist Mark Webber, the song "was an old song that Jarvis dredged up and we all dusted off. There's a rehearsal tape of a previous incarnation of Pulp attempting it circa 1984." Cocker explained:

Webber himself contributed the song's guitar solo; he recalled, Something Changed' is the first guitar solo I've sat and written, but I didn't let anyone else know about it until we went into the studio and did it."

Cocker said of the song in 2020, "That's the one Pulp song that seems to crop up. I've been stopped by a lot of people who tell me that song was played at their wedding. They walked down the aisle to it!"

Release
"Something Changed" was released as the fourth and final single from Different Class. The single was released with two different sleeves (a "boy" and "girl" version), but with identical track listings. Like the other singles from the album, the song charted in the top ten in the UK, reaching number ten. A music video for the song was also produced. The song also appeared on the Pulp compilation album Hits.

The B-side, "Mile End" appeared on the Trainspotting soundtrack album. The single also features a remixed version of "F.E.E.L.I.N.G.C.A.L.L.E.D.L.O.V.E" produced by Moloko. At the time of the single's release, Cocker said of Moloko, "I like Moloko. They've done a remix of "F.E.E.L.I.N.G.C.A.L.L.E.D.L.O.V.E" on this new single. I predict great things for them this year."

Reception
"Something Changed" has seen critical acclaim since its release. Robert Christgau of The Village Voice wrote in his review of Different Class, "If 'Common People' should fall short, I recommend Island proceed directly to 'Something Changed,' a happy love song every bit as clever and realistic as his class war song." David Fricke of Rolling Stone praised the song's "delightfully cheesy loser's-lounge blend of strings and low, throaty guitar twang," while Simon Reynolds of Pitchfork said that the song was "a straightforwardly romantic and gorgeously touching song about the unknown and unknowable turning points in anyone's life." Adrien Begrand of PopMatters called the song "sweet."

Track listings

Personnel
 Written by Pulp
 Lyrics by Jarvis Cocker
 Jarvis Cocker: Vocals, Electric Guitar
 Mark Webber: Electric Guitar
 Candida Doyle: Keyboards
 Russell Senior: Acoustic Guitar
 Steve Mackey: Bass Guitar
 Nick Banks: Drums

Charts

Covers
Spanish band Astrud released an album of rarities and b-sides called Algo cambió (Spanish for Something Changed) which featured a Spanish-language version of the song.

References

1995 songs
1996 singles
Island Records singles
Pulp (band) songs
Song recordings produced by Chris Thomas (record producer)
Songs written by Candida Doyle
Songs written by Jarvis Cocker
Songs written by Mark Webber (guitarist)
Songs written by Nick Banks
Songs written by Russell Senior
Songs written by Steve Mackey